Dui Prithibi may refer

 Dui Prithibi (1980 film), Indian Bengali classic film
 Dui Prithibi (2010 film), Indian Bengali film
 Dui Prithibi (2015 film), Bangladeshi film